Sepp Behr (born 20 February 1930) is a German former alpine skier who competed in the 1956 Winter Olympics.

References

1930 births
Living people
German male alpine skiers
Olympic alpine skiers of the United Team of Germany
Alpine skiers at the 1956 Winter Olympics
Alpine skiers at the 1960 Winter Olympics
20th-century German people